Lake Burbury is a man-made water reservoir created by the Crotty Dam inundating the upper King River valley that lies east of the West Coast Range. Discharge from the reservoir feeds the John Butters Hydroelectric Power Station, owned and operated by Hydro Tasmania.

The reservoir was named in honour of Stanley Burbury, a former Governor of Tasmania.

Water source
The lake is fed mainly by rivers from the north, including the upper King River, and the Eldon River. Valleys that open to the area include the Linda Valley. It also has a natural lake just north of its northern shore known as Lake Beatrice which is at the eastern end of Mount Sedgwick.

Fishing

It is popular as a fishing lake, but is susceptible to extreme weather.  Its feeder rivers are the upper King, Nelson, Princess, and Eldon Rivers.  There are design features in the Crotty Dam to lower the surface level rapidly in the event of severe floodwaters.

The lake has the "Bradshaw" bridge crossing it to connect the Lyell Highway across it, and has two dams – one in the King River Gorge – the Crotty Dam, and the other adjacent to Mount Darwin, the Darwin Dam.

Inundation
The dam inundated the historical sites of the Darwin and Crotty – as well as the bridge of the North Mount Lyell Railway over the King River which was not salvaged before the flooding.  Significant portions of the Kelly Basin Road are inundated as well.

The Crotty Dam site had been surveyed in the early twentieth century but the proposed dam did not proceed at that time. It was re-visited in the 1980s and involved in the last major dam construction by Hydro Tasmania.

Crotty Dam and Lake Burbury have been identified as "indicative places" on the (now defunct) Register of the National Estate.

Reserves

The lake lies to the west of the Franklin-Gordon Wild Rivers National Park and has a series of buffer zone conservation areas; the Princess River Conservation Area and the Crotty Conservation Area on the east shore, and the West Coast Range Regional Reserve on the west.  The Hydro Tasmania jurisdiction of the lake is to the  elevation (the full supply level being ) round the edge of the lake, as well as the island created by the impoundment.

A webcam is located on the south east shore of the lake which looks across to where the Lyell Highway emerges from the Linda Valley and moves south around the eastern base of Mount Owen.

See also

List of reservoirs and dams in Tasmania
List of lakes in Tasmania

References

Further reading

External links
 Hydro Tasmania information
 Australian Heritage Database entry

Burbury
West Coast Range
King River power development scheme